In Christianity, a sin of omission is a sin committed by willingly not performing a certain action. Its opposite is the sin of commission, i.e. a sin resulting from an action performed.

Catholicism 
In the Catholic view, a sin of omission is a failure by a person to take an action that one "ought to do", and that is within ones power, and when attentively and willfully done, it is considered to be a sin. Like sins of commission (sins resulting from actions performed), the extent to which guilt is afforded by a particular sin of omission is determined by the extent of deliberation involved in the act, and by the magnitude of the precept and the dignity of the virtue that the omission opposes.

Definition 
Sin of omission, in Catholic teaching, is, as Joseph Delaney states in the Catholic Encyclopedia (1911),the failure to do something one can and ought to do. If this happens advertently and freely a sin is committed. [...] The degree of guilt incurred by an omission is measured like that attaching to sins of commission, by the dignity of the virtue and the magnitude of the precept to which the omission is opposed as well as the amount of deliberation.A person may be guilty of a sin of omission if—as Joseph Delaney states in the Catholic Encyclopedia (1911)—they fail "to do something which [they] are able to do" and which they ought to do, because they have put themself into a state or situation whereby they are unable to complete the action. For example, if a person chooses to drink to excess and is therefore unable to perform a necessary task, that person is responsible for that failure, even though that person is physically unable to perform the task because they knowingly put themself into a state (drunkenness) where accomplishing the task was impossible.

Lutheranism
In Lutheran theology, a sin of omission is defined as "a certain illicit positive act, either an internal act of the will, as, for example, to will to omit what had been commanded, or an external act, as an operation by which any one is hindered from that which he ought to do; yet such a positive act is not always or necessarily required, but the mere fact that one does not do what is commanded is sin."

In contrast, "Sins of commission are positive acts, by which the negative precepts of God are violated."

See also
 Half-truth
 Omission (law)
 Omission bias

References

Further reading
 
 

Christian hamartiology
Catholic theology and doctrine
Sin